The Odisha Film Development Corporation is a Public Sector Undertaking (PSU) of Government of Odisha. Odisha Film Development Corporation is a promotional agency for the growth and development of film industry in Odisha established in 1976 in Cuttack to promote the Odia film industry.

Achievements
 Establishment of Kalinga Studios with Complete Facilities for Indoor Shooting, Outdoor Shooting, Editing, Dubbing, Music Recording (Mono Stereo), Mixing in 16mm, 35mm and Cinema Scope Format
 Establishment of Prasad Kalinga Film Laboratory for Processing and Printing of Colour and Black & White Films in 16mm, 35mm and Cinema Scope Format
 Establishment of a Video Complex in Kalinga Studio for Production of Video Films, Telefilms and Serials with Facilities for Editing, Recording, Dubbing and Shooting
 Organisation of 16 of Regional Film Festivals for Screening of Various Award Winning and Indian Panorama Films
 Organisation of 9 of Children's Film Festivals in Collaboration with Children Film Society of India
 Organisation of the 5th International Children's Film Festival in the Year 1987
 Organisation of 13 Foreign Film Festivals
 Sanction of subsidy to 283 Oriya & Other Languages Featured Films & Documentary Films
 Sanction of subsidy to 13 New Cinema Houses Equivalent to ET Collected for First 2 Years
 Sanction of loan for Construction of Cinema Houses to 86 Entrepreneurs
 Sanction of Soft Loans for Production of 95 Odia Featured Films
 Sanction of Term Loan for Production of 41 Odia Feature Films
 Establishment of an Office Complex known as Chalachitra Bhawan to House the Headquarter of the OFDC at Cuttack with a Film Archive and Preview Theatre
 Declaration of Film Production and Cinema Hall Construction as Industrial Activities
 Enforcement of Compulsory Screening of Odia Feature Films in the Cinema Houses since 11 December 1978
 Opening of Regional Office of the Board of Film Certification

Past Chairpersons
Muzibula Khan, Chairman of Odisha Film Development Corporation
 Devdas Chhotray, Director of Odisha Film Development Corporation (1983-89 & 1996-98).
 Sarat Pujari, Member of the Board of Directors

See also
 National Film Development Corporation of India

References

External links
 Official Website of Odisha Film Development Corporation (OFDC)

Cinema of Odisha
State agencies of Odisha
Film organisations in India
Government agencies established in 1976
1976 establishments in Orissa
Cuttack